Lichfield Theological College was founded in 1857 to train Anglican clergy to serve in the Church of England. It was located on the south side of the Cathedral Close in Lichfield, Staffordshire and closed in 1972.

Notable staff

 Cecil Cherrington, lecturer, later Bishop of Waikato, New Zealand
 George Kilpatrick, lecturer, later Dean Ireland's Professor of the Exegesis of Holy Scripture at the University of Oxford
 Barry Rogerson, lecturer, later Bishop of Bristol
 James Srawley, Vice-Principal, later Canon of Lincoln Cathedral

List of Principals

 John Fenton, Principal from 1958 to 1965
 John Yates, Principal from 1966 to 1972

Notable alumni

 John Barker, Dean of Cloyne in the Church of Ireland
 French Chang-Him, Bishop of The Seychelles and Archbishop of the Indian Ocean
 Mervyn Charles-Edwards, Bishop of Worcester
 Malcolm Clark, Dean of Edinburgh
 Robert Hodson, Bishop of Shrewsbury
 Sope Johnson, Provost of the Cathedral Church of Christ, Lagos
 Hope Patten, Anglo-Catholic priest known for his restoration of the Anglican Shrine of Our Lady of Walsingham
 John Simkin, Bishop of Auckland, New Zealand
 Horace Tonks, Bishop of the Windward Islands
 Frank Weston, Bishop of Knaresborough

References

Educational institutions established in 1857
Educational institutions disestablished in 1972
Anglican seminaries and theological colleges
Former theological colleges in England
Education in Lichfield
Religion in Staffordshire
1857 establishments in England